Suave may refer to:
Suave (personal care brand), a brand owned by Unilever
Suave (singer) (born 1966), American R&B singer
Suave House Records, a record label based in Houston, Texas
"Suave (Kiss Me)", a 2011 song by American singer-songwriter Nayer
"Suave" (song), a song by Luis Miguel
"Suave", a song by Calle 13 from Calle 13
"Suave", a 2017 song by El Alfa

See also 
 Mr. Suave, a 2003 Filipino film
 Suavecito (disambiguation)
 Suavemente (disambiguation)